Gocha Gogrichiani (born 12 August 1964) is a Georgian football coach and a former player.

He won nine international caps and scored two goals for the Georgian national team, including the fourth goal in a 5–0 rout of Wales in Tbilisi in November 1994, during the qualifiers for Euro 96.

At club level, he spent his peak years with Tskhumi Sukhumi, Zhemchuzhina Sochi, and Omonia Nicosia.

Honours
 Russian First Division Zone West top scorer: 1992 (26 goals).

Personal life
His son, also called Gocha Gogrichiani, is a professional footballer as well.

External links

FIFA.com

1964 births
Living people
Sportspeople from Sukhumi
Soviet footballers
Footballers from Georgia (country)
Expatriate footballers from Georgia (country)
FC Dinamo Tbilisi players
FC Dinamo Sukhumi players
FC Zhemchuzhina Sochi players
AC Omonia players
Nea Salamis Famagusta FC players
Georgia (country) international footballers
Russian Premier League players
Cypriot First Division players
Expatriate footballers in Cyprus
Expatriate footballers in Russia
Association football forwards
FC Guria Lanchkhuti players
FC Lokomotiv Nizhny Novgorod players
Football managers from Georgia (country)
FC Oryol players
FC SKA Rostov-on-Don players